Cassidy v Ministry of Health [1951] 2 KB 343 is an English tort law and UK labour law case concerning the scope of vicarious liability.

Facts
Mr Cassidy went to hospital for a routine operation on his hand, but came away with stiff fingers because of the negligence of one of the doctors. He attempted to sue the Ministry of Health in its capacity as employer. The Ministry argued it could not be held responsible and had no vicarious liability, relying partly on Collins v Hertfordshire where it had been suggested that a surgeon was not the 'servant' of his employer.

Judgment
The Court of Appeal held that the doctor was indeed a servant of the hospital and the Ministry was vicariously liable, because the doctor was integrated into the health organisation. Denning LJ said,

He also noted, that where a patient selects the doctor, then the doctor will not be employed by a hospital.

See also

Contract of employment in English law
EU labour law
US labor law
German labour law

Notes

References

United Kingdom labour case law
Court of Appeal (England and Wales) cases
1951 in case law
1951 in British law
English tort case law